Alonzo Church (April 9, 1793 – May 18, 1862) was the sixth president of the University of Georgia (UGA). He served in that capacity from 1829 until his resignation in 1859.

Church was born on April 9, 1793, in Brattleboro, Vermont. He was an 1816 graduate of Middlebury College. He initially joined the UGA faculty as a Professor of Mathematics and served in that capacity for ten years before assuming the presidency.

Although Church served longer than any president of the University, there were numerous clashes with student and faculty during his tenure which resulted in declines in enrollment and faculty upheaval.

During Church's tenure, the following campus buildings were erected: Classroom/Library (Southern half of current Academic Building, 1831), the Chapel (1832), Phi Kappa Hall (1836), Lumpkin House (Rock House, 1844), Lustrat House (1847), Garden Club House (1857) and  The Arch (1858) (funded through sale of the University Botanical Garden for $1,000).

President Church's son, Alonzo Webster Church, was Librarian of the United States Senate. President Church's great-grandson, Alonzo Church, was a renowned Professor of Mathematics; he taught at both Princeton University (his alma mater) and UCLA. 

President Church's daughter, Julia, married George Alexander Croom, owner of Casa de Laga Plantation in Tallahassee, Florida, Father of Alonzo Church Croom, Comptroller of the State of Florida from 1900 until his death on December 7, 1912, and brother of Hardy Bryan Croom, a planter and recognized naturalist, who discovered the rare Torreya tree and established Goodwood Plantation.

Death and legacy
Church Street in Athens, Georgia, is named in Church's honor.

References

 History of the University of Georgia, by Thomas Walter Reed, University of Georgia, 1949. (See especially Chapters IV and V.)
 Church, Alonzo, in The National Cyclopaedia of American Biography, vol. IX, James T. White & Company, 1899, pp. 180–181.
 Rev. Dr. Alonzo Church in A Standard History of Georgia and Georgians by Lucian Lamar Knight, The Lewis Publishing Company, 1917, vol. V, pp. 2659–2660.
 From Ahmedunggar to Lavonia Presidents at the University of Georgia 1785-1997, University of Georgia Libraries, Hargrett Rare Book and Manuscript Library
 Alumni Heritage: The Portrait of Dr. Alonzo Church, University of Georgia Alumni Association.
 Famous people of Eatonton and Putnam County, Eatonton-Putnam Chamber of Commerce and Putnam Development Authority.
 Portrait of Alonzo Church from Catalogue of the Officers and Students of Franklin College, University of Georgia, Athens, 1852-53.
 Church-Waddel-Brumby House (built by Church, currently serves as the Athens Welcome Center).
 Homewood (Church's summer residence).

1793 births
1862 deaths
Presidents of the University of Georgia
People from Brattleboro, Vermont
American slave owners